Steve Hargrave is an English broadcast journalist, TV presenter, Writer and filmmaker known for his unique celebrity interviews and red-carpet reports.

Broadcasting career 
Hargrave began his career presenting, reporting and producing news for 2CR Radio in Bournemouth before hosting Entertainment News for Independent Radio News. He then joined ITN produced services London Tonight and ITV News as an entertainment correspondent, where he also created, wrote, produced and presented ITV2's daily showbiz news bulletin. He was subsequently named one of Broadcast magazine's under-30 UK Media Hotshots.

In 2008 he joined Sky News as an entertainment correspondent where he regularly reported live from red carpets at events such as the Oscars the Cannes Film Festival and reported live on major breaking news stories such as Michael Jackson's death.

On 6 September 2010 he joined ITV's Flagship Breakfast Show Daybreak as an entertainment correspondent. He became known for his irreverent, unique and humorous interviews, such as playing ukulele with Dolly Parton and hanging backstage with Usher.

Hargrave went on to join Australian breakfast show Sunrise as their UK Correspondent, where he reports on national news items as well as continuing his celebrity interviews, gaining particular acclaim in Australia for singing to Keira Knightley. He has also returned to Sky News where he appears on Monday mornings alongside Eamonn Holmes.

Hargrave has also hosted the music news on BBC 6 Music, presented a weekly gig guide for LBC Radio and has his own music blog Ain't No Cure. In 2014 he began writing for US music magazine Paste.

References

External links
Official Website
Steve Hargrave on Twitter
Steve Hargrave on Instagram

Living people
English television journalists
English television presenters
English television producers
English radio personalities
ITV Breakfast presenters and reporters
ITV regional newsreaders and journalists
ITN newsreaders and journalists
Sky News newsreaders and journalists
People from Dorchester, Dorset
1978 births